KTHS-FM (107.1 MHz) is a commercial FM radio station licensed to Berryville, Arkansas.  The station broadcasts a country music radio format and is owned by Carroll County Broadcasting, Inc.

History
On December 19, 1974, the station signed on the air.  Its original call sign was KAAM and it was co-owned with KTHS 1480 AM.  The two stations featured country music formats but were separately programmed.  The AM station had more news, talk and features while KAAM was automated with minimal talk and longer sweeps of music.  KAAM was a network affiliate of the ABC Information Network.

In 2006, Caroll County Broadcasting bought KTHS-AM-FM for $3.5 million.

References

External links
KTHS-FM's official website

THS
Country radio stations in the United States